The Jinhua–Taizhou railway is a single-track electrified passenger and freight railway in China.

History
Construction on the railway began in 2016. It had been expected to be finished by the end of 2020, but opening was delayed. It opened on 25 June 2021.

Infrastructure
From Yongkang South railway station on the Jinhua–Wenzhou high-speed railway, the railway heads east. After Linhai East, the line splits with one branch continuing east to Toumen Port and the other heading south and terminating at Taizhou West.

References

Railway lines in China
Railway lines opened in 2021